The House of Susan Lulham (2014) is a crime/ghost story novella by British author Phil Rickman, what he describes as the "12 and a half" entry in his Merrily Watkins series, about a female vicar and diocesan exorcist for the cathedral city of Hereford. The Watkins stories combine supernatural and mystery elements, leading them to be classified variously as horror and crime fiction (though Rickman personally rejects the label of horror writer).

The novella in its original form was published as a short story in the OxCrimes collection, which gathered 27 short crime stories, part of a series of differently themed books in support of Oxfam, the African aid charity. The story was then extended to one more than five times as long, after readers expressed an interest in reading the rest of the story. This lengthened edition came out as a Kindle book before reaching print.

Synopsis
Zoe Mahonie calls diocesan exorcist Merrily Watkins to her and her husband's new home after becoming convinced that its late previous tenant, Susan "Suze" Lulham, is still in residence, causing paranormal disturbances. Suze was a wealthy hairdresser who, after a bad breakup with a married television actor, committed suicide in the living room with a razor, spraying blood everywhere. When a second bloody death takes place in the house, Merrily investigates its past, and whether Zoe is deeply disturbed or genuinely haunted.

References

2014 British novels
British crime novels
Ghost novels